Florence Island is a small rocky island lying  south of Derby Island near the northern extremity of Astrolabe Glacier Tongue, Antarctica. it was charted by the French Antarctic Expedition in 1951 and named after Florence, Italy.

See also 
 List of Antarctic and sub-Antarctic islands

References 

Islands of Adélie Land